Jennifer Elkins is a Democratic politician from Michigan who served one term in the Michigan House of Representatives, in 2003 and 2004, until being unseated by Tim Moore. Prior to her election to the House, Elkins was a member of the Clare County Board of Commissioners.

Elkins was passionate about youth and social services, serving as a member of the executive committee of the Mid-Michigan Community Action Agency, as vice chair of the Human Services Coordinating Body during her tenure on the county board, as a member of the Michigan Association of Counties' Human Services Committee, and with numerous other area and community organizations.

References

Democratic Party members of the Michigan House of Representatives
Women state legislators in Michigan
People from Clare County, Michigan
Living people
Year of birth missing (living people)
County commissioners in Michigan
20th-century American women politicians
21st-century American women politicians